Hilburn may refer to:

Places
United States
 Hilburn, Texas, an unincorporated community
 Hilburn, Wisconsin, an unincorporated community

People with the surname
 Paula Blackton nee Hilburn (1881–1930), American actress
 Robert Hilburn (born 1939), American music critic and author
 Wiley W. Hilburn (1938–2014), American journalist